"I'm Goin' Down" is a rock song written and performed by American singer-songwriter Bruce Springsteen. It was released on August 27, 1985 by Columbia Records as the sixth single from his 1984 album Born in the U.S.A. The song was recorded with the E Street Band in May 1982 at the Power Station music studio, and co-produced by Springsteen, Jon Landau, Chuck Plotkin, and Steve Van Zandt. Although Springsteen had changing ideas about the songs to put on the album, "I'm Goin' Down" was ultimately selected for inclusion.

The recording is based on an energetic band performance that gives prominence to a heavy drum sound. The lyrics focus on sexual frustration in a deteriorating relationship. The single reached No. 9 in the United States and the top 30 in Sweden, Italy, and Canada. On the album's release, it was praised by critics for the band's musicianship and Springsteen's vocals and lyrics. Later it received favorable rankings in retrospectives of Springsteen's career, among which was an NME list calling it his fourth best song.

Springsteen has not often performed the song since the Born in the U.S.A. Tour. Between 2002 and 2017, it appeared on about seven percent of the set lists published on his official website. "I'm Goin' Down" has been covered by Frank Black and the Catholics, Trampled by Turtles, Free Energy, Vampire Weekend, and other artists.

Background and recording

American singer-songwriter Bruce Springsteen's fifth album, The River, was released in October 1980 and reached No. 1 in the Billboard Top LPs & Tape chart. His follow-up, Nebraska, began as a series of solo demo recordings, of which fifteen songs were mixed onto a cassette on January 3, 1982. That April, he began recording sessions at the Power Station music studio in New York City with the E Street Band—whose line-up then consisted of Roy Bittan, Clarence Clemons, Danny Federici, Garry Tallent, Steve Van Zandt, and Max Weinberg—with production by Springsteen, Van Zandt, Jon Landau, and Chuck Plotkin.

He at first recorded a number of full-band versions of Nebraska songs, including "Atlantic City", "Nebraska", and "Mansion on the Hill". However, he and his co-producers were dissatisfied with the recordings. To buy time to decide on the best approach for these songs, by May 1982 the band had begun to record other material he had written. "I'm Goin' Down" was recorded over May 12–13, with Toby Scott as the audio engineer, and Billy Straus one of his assistants. In 2012, Clinton Heylin wrote that throughout the ten recorded takes of the song, Springsteen let the band "vamp away, only to curtail them in the final mix". Eventually, Springsteen released ten of the solo recordings from the January cassette as the Nebraska album, which came out in September 1982, and temporarily shelved "I'm Goin' Down" and other band tracks from May.

In 1983, he recorded more songs with the E Street Band, but was considering using solo tracks for his next album, which eventually became Born in the U.S.A., as he had done for Nebraska. By the following year, Landau and Plotkin had convinced Springsteen to release band tracks, including several from May 1982 and a number of subsequently recorded songs. At one point, Springsteen was not going to include "I'm Goin' Down" on Born in the U.S.A., but later added it in place of "Pink Cadillac", which he used as the B-side for "Dancing in the Dark".

Music, lyrics, and themes

Music

A rock song, "I'm Goin' Down" is described by Uncut contributor John Lewis as having a country music influence, and "sound[ing] in places like Johnny Cash". For other critics, the song contains rockabilly elements. It begins with a short two-phrase guitar line, followed by Weinberg's heavy drum beat, one of the most prominent components in the song. Music biographers Jean-Michel Guesdon and Philippe Margotin have commented on Bob Clearmountain's "signature" mixing of the track that makes the snare drum sound "[crack] like a whip". These instruments are supplemented by bass by Tallent, a Hammond B-3 organ part by Federici, and piano by Bittan. The song additionally includes a tenor saxophone solo by Clemons, and hand-clapping by the band. The music is based on a descending chord progression of A ("I'm goin")–E ("down, down down")–Fm ("down, I'm goin")–D ("down"), which is played throughout the track, while the bass guitar plays around the root of E.

Lyrics and themes
Reviewers have commented on the contrast between the song's upbeat music and sad lyrics. The song explores themes of sexual or romantic frustration, loneliness, and grief resulting from unsuccessful relationships. Some reviewers have found humor in the lyrics, which describe incidents such as the narrator's girlfriend rejecting his attempts at intimacy and sighing with boredom, as well as the couple returning home fighting after a date. In concert, Springsteen has described "I'm Goin' Down" in jest as "one of my more insightful songs about men and women". In live performances from 1984, he sometimes used variations of the following introduction for the song: "[First] you're making love to 'em all the time, three or four times a day. Then you come back a little bit later, and, uh-oh ... it's like 'Are you gonna make love to me tonight, or are we gonna wait for the full moon again', y'know?"

In researcher Pamela Moss's feminist analysis of social class and gender in Springsteen's lyrics, she describes the singer's early-to-mid-1980s oeuvre as being filled with despair. Moss states that within this context, men fault women for not helping them achieve their dream of finding "a promised land". In "I'm Goin' Down", with the "deterioration of a desirable sexual relationship [the narrator] feels he is being 'set up' by the woman just so she will be able to reject him". According to Moss, the man sees the woman's rejection as interference holding back his attempt at a "liberation of the tedium of a working class existence".

Release and reception
Born in the U.S.A. was released on June 4, 1984 by Columbia Records, and "I'm Goin' Down", the album's sixth single, on August 27, 1985. The 7-inch single version includes B-side "Janey, Don't You Lose Heart", while the 12-inch Maxi has "Janey, Don't You Lose Heart" and "Held Up Without a Gun". In the United States, "I'm Goin' Down" entered the Billboard Hot 100 singles chart on September 7, and peaked at No. 9 on October 25. It was one of a record-tying seven top 10 singles to be released from a single album. It also charted in Canada, Australia, Italy, Sweden, and Germany. No music video was made for the song. The track was additionally released on 12" Single Collection in 1985, and The Album Collection Vol. 1 1973–1984 in 2014. Writer Greg Kot has noted that despite the single's chart success, the song was not included on Springsteen's 1995 Greatest Hits compilation.

"I'm Goin' Down" was generally well received by critics at the time of the album's release. Some reviewers considered the song to be among the best on Born in the U.S.A., including Ken Tucker of The Philadelphia Inquirer, who called the track one of the "emotional centerpieces on the album, and perhaps [one of] the finest examples of Springsteen's songwriting to date". The Morning Calls Paul Willistein and The Cincinnati Enquirers Cliff Radel similarly commended the songwriting. Willistein wrote that the composition "evidences vulnerability, sensitivity and wisdom". Among the musical components praised by critics were its percussion, vocals, and guitar, as well as Clemons' saxophone solo. The musicians' passion and the song's fun energy were other elements singled out by reviewers. Debbie Miller of Rolling Stone described the track as "wonderfully exuberant". Sounds critic Sandy Robertson, reviewing a pre-release version of Born in the U.S.A. on which the title was listed as "Down Down Down", characterized the song as "a hit single if I ever heard one" and "the core that justifies most of the hype dumped on [Springsteen]".

Some contemporary reviews were negative or neutral. The Vancouver Suns Ian Gill dismissed the track as "simply a concession to the zit set". About the song's choice as the album's sixth single, critic Jan DeKnock called the release "the dud of the week" that was "an uninspired ... filler cut". David Hinkley of New York's Daily News considered it an unexceptional song on which Springsteen did not add much that was new to its common theme.

Live performances
Springsteen has played "I'm Goin' Down" infrequently since the end of the Born in the U.S.A. Tour. For his tours between 2002 and 2017, many of the set lists have been published on his official website, Brucespringsteen.net. Of these, all of the singer's performances of the song are listed in the table below.

Springsteen sometimes takes song requests at concerts by collecting signs from the audience, as he did for "I'm Goin' Down" on May 21, 2009 in East Rutherford, New Jersey, on February 27, 2016 in Rochester, New York, and on August 2, 2008 in Foxborough, Massachusetts—where he introduced the song as "rarely played and even more rarely requested".

A number of music critics have mentioned how live versions differ from the Born in the U.S.A. version. Describing a performance of the song at an August 25, 1984 show in Landover, Maryland, critic Geoffrey Himes wrote that the "lean, synth-dominated album arrangement was supplanted by a full-tilt rock 'n' soul version". Springsteen later admitted that the recorded version "had a swing ... we could never capture live".

Legacy and cover versions
"I'm Goin' Down" has received various ratings in overviews that consider all of Springsteen's songs. A 2017 article in NME calls it the fourth greatest Springsteen song of all time. A 2014 Rolling Stone article ranks "I'm Goin' Down" as the 52nd best Bruce Springsteen song ever, and it is included in writer June Skinner Sawyer's Tougher Than the Rest: 100 Best Bruce Springsteen Songs. By contrast, in Counting Down Bruce Springsteen: His 100 Finest Songs, Jim Beviglia puts "I'm Goin' Down" as the 131st best Springsteen track, calling it "a fun but relatively minor" work. A critic for NJ.com described it as the worst song of Born in the U.S.A., and placed it in the No. 164 position of 318 of the singer's works. In 2015, Uncut rated the song four stars out of five.

In the Billboard 2014 article "Bruce Springsteen's Born in the U.S.A. at 30: Classic Track-By-Track Album Review", Caryn Rose called it the album's "most underrated song" and "the kind of good-time party song that Springsteen and E Street do best, sliding easily through the verses with a ... bouncing rhythm ... and a fun, jumping end". The song is likewise described favorably in "Born in the U.S.A. has stood the test of time", a 2002 overview in New Jersey's Daily Record newspaper.

Following the September 11, 2001 terrorist attacks in the eastern United States, Clear Channel Communications—the owner at the time of over 1000 radio stations—issued a memorandum of songs to temporarily avoid playing, which included "I'm Goin' Down". The list comprised songs that were "too dark  ... [or referred] to crashes ... or death", or that simply had "questionable" titles, which might depress listeners grieving from the attacks.

Various musicians have covered "I'm Goin' Down". In 1998, Frank Black and the Catholics—whose bandleader has expressed his admiration for the "brilliant ... structure" of Springsteen's recording—included a version on their "Dog Gone" single, and in 2015 on The Complete Recordings. Rancid frontman Tim Armstrong put out a cover in 2012 as part of his Tim Timebomb and Friends collection, while Dessa released a version on her 2013 album Parts of Speech. The following year, a recording with fiddles and banjos by bluegrass group Trampled by Turtles, who have frequently played "I'm Goin' Down" in concert, appeared on the multi-artist compilation album Dead Man's Town: A Tribute to Born in the U.S.A.

In September 2010, the online magazines Stereogum and Pitchfork noted how multiple bands had recently performed "I'm Goin' Down" in live settings within weeks of each other: Vampire Weekend played the song in concert in Vancouver and a few days later in early September on a radio show in Seattle, while Free Energy and Titus Andronicus performed it together later that month in Atlanta on their joint tour. Like Frank Black, members of Vampire Weekend have expressed their high regard for Springsteen's composition, among whom vocalist Ezra Koenig had previously listened to the song "constantly", and bassist Chris Baio cited Springsteen's "incredible melodies, incredible lyrics" that led the band to think "it would be exciting to put our spin on" the song. Free Energy and Vampire Weekend each released a recording of it on iTunes in 2010. Other releases include a Spotify single by Vampire Weekend in 2019.

Formats and track listing
7-inch single
"I'm Goin' Down" – 3:29
"Janey, Don't You Lose Heart" – 3:23

12-inch single
"I'm Goin' Down" – 3:29
"Janey, Don't You Lose Heart" – 3:23
"Held Up Without a Gun" – 1:15

Charts

Personnel
The personnel listed below participated in the recording of "I'm Goin' Down":

Musicians:
 Bruce Springsteen – vocals, guitars
 Steve Van Zandt – guitars
 Clarence Clemons – saxophone, tambourine
 Roy Bittan – piano
 Danny Federici – organ
 Garry Tallent – bass
 Max Weinberg – drums
 The group – handclaps

Technical team:
 Bruce Springsteen – producer
 Jon Landau – producer
 Chuck Plotkin – producer
 Steve Van Zandt – producer
 Toby Scott – audio engineer
 John Davenport – assistant audio engineer
 Jeff Hendrickson – assistant audio engineer
 Bruce Lampcov – assistant audio engineer
 Billy Straus – assistant audio engineer
 Zoë Yanakas – assistant audio engineer
 Bob Clearmountain – mixing
 Bob Ludwig – mastering

Notes

Footnotes

References

 
 
 
 
 
 
 
 
 
 
 
 
 
 
 
 
 
 
 
 
 
 
 
 
 
 
 
 
 
 
 
 
 
 
 
 
 
 
 
 
 
 
 
 
 
 
 
 
 
 
 
 
 
 
 
 
 
 
 
 
 
 
 
 
 
 
 
 
 
 
 
 
 
 
 
 
 
 
 
 
 
 
 
 
 
 
 
 
 
 

Bruce Springsteen songs
1984 songs
1985 singles
Columbia Records singles
Songs written by Bruce Springsteen
Song recordings produced by Bruce Springsteen
Song recordings produced by Jon Landau
Song recordings produced by Steven Van Zandt
Song recordings produced by Chuck Plotkin